Chromium(II) carbide is a ceramic compound that exists in several chemical compositions: Cr3C2, Cr7C3, and  Cr23C6. At standard conditions it exists as a gray solid. It is extremely hard and corrosion resistant. It is also a refractory compound, which means that it retains its strength at high temperatures as well. These properties make it useful as an additive to metal alloys. When chromium carbide crystals are integrated into the surface of a metal it improves the wear resistance and corrosion resistance of the metal, and maintains these properties at elevated temperatures. The hardest and most commonly used composition for this purpose is Cr3C2.

The mineral form of the Cr3C2 compound is tongbaite. Isovite, is a related mineral. Both are extremely rare. Yet another chromium-rich carbide mineral is yarlongite, Cr4Fe4NiC4.

Properties
There are three different crystal structures for chromium carbide corresponding to the three different chemical compositions. Cr23C6 has a cubic crystal structure and a Vickers hardness of 976 kg/mm2. Cr7C3 has a hexagonal crystal structure and a microhardness of 1336 kg/mm2. Cr3C2 is the most durable of the three compositions, and has an orthorhombic crystal structure with a microhardness of 2280 kg/mm2. For this reason Cr3C2 is the primary form of chromium carbide used in surface treatment.

Synthesis
Synthesis of chromium carbide can be achieved through mechanical alloying. In this type of process metallic chromium and pure carbon in the form of graphite are loaded into a ball mill and ground into a fine powder. After the components have been ground they are pressed into a pellet and subjected to hot isostatic pressing. Hot isostatic pressing utilizes an inert gas, primarily argon, in a sealed oven. This pressurized gas applies pressure to the sample from all directions while the oven is heated. The heat and pressure cause the graphite and metallic chromium to react and form chromium carbide. Decreasing the percentage of carbon content in the initial mixture results in an increase in the yield of the Cr7C3, and Cr23C6 forms of chromium carbide.

Another method for the synthesis of chromium carbide utilizes chromium oxide, pure aluminum, and graphite in a self-propagating exothermic reaction that proceeds as follows:

3Cr2O3 + 6Al + 4C → 2Cr3C2 + 3Al2O3

In this method the reactants are ground and blended in a ball mill. The blended powder is then pressed into a pellet and placed under an inert atmosphere of argon. The sample is then heated. A heated wire, a spark, a laser, or an oven may provide the heat. The exothermic reaction is initiated, and the resulting heat propagates the reaction throughout the rest of the sample.

Uses
Chromium carbide is useful in the surface treatment of metal components. Chromium carbide is used to coat the surface of another metal in a technique known as thermal spraying. Cr3C2 powder is mixed with solid nickel-chromium. This mixture is then heated to very high temperatures and sprayed onto the object being coated where it forms a protective layer. This layer is essentially its own metal matrix composite, consisting of hard ceramic Cr3C2 particles embedded in a nickel-chromium matrix. The matrix itself contributes to the corrosion resistance of the coating because both nickel and chromium are corrosion resistant in their metallic form. After over spraying the coating, the coated part must run through a diffusion heat treatment to reach the best results in matter of coupling strength to the base metal and also in matter of hardness.

Another technique utilizes chromium carbide in the form of overlay plates. These are prefabricated chromium carbide-coated steel plates, which are meant to be welded onto existing structures or machinery in order to improve performance.

Chromium carbide is used as an additive in cutting tools made of cemented carbides, in order to improve hardness by preventing the growth of large grains. The primary constituent in most extremely hard cutting tools is tungsten carbide. The tungsten carbide is combined with other carbides such as titanium carbide, niobium carbide, and chromium carbide and sintered together with a cobalt matrix. Cr3C2 prevents large grains from forming in the composite, which results in a fine-grained structure of superior hardness.

Undesired formation of chromium carbides in stainless steel and other alloys can lead to intergranular corrosion.

References

External links
 National Pollutant Inventory - Chromium (III) compounds fact sheet

Carbides
Chromium(II) compounds
Refractory materials
Superhard materials